Andrew Tracy (December 15, 1797 – October 28, 1868) was an American politician, teacher and lawyer. He served as a U.S. Representative from Vermont.

Early life
Tracy was born in Hartford, Vermont, to James Tracy and Mercy Richmond Tracy. He attended Royalton and Randolph Academies, before attending Dartmouth College in Hanover, New Hampshire, for two years. He taught school, studied law with George E. Wales, and was admitted to the bar in 1826. He began the practice of law in Quechee, Vermont, and in 1838 moved to Woodstock, Vermont, where he continued to practice law.

Political career
Tracy was member of the Vermont House of Representatives from 1833 until 1837. He served in the Vermont Senate in 1839 and was an unsuccessful candidate for election in 1840 to the Twenty-seventh Congress. He was a member of the Vermont House again from 1843 until 1845, and served as speaker.
He was a Presidential Elector for Vermont in 1848.
 
He was elected as a Whig candidate to the Thirty-third Congress, serving from March 4, 1853, until March 3, 1855. He declined to be a candidate for renomination in 1854 to the Thirty-fourth Congress. After leaving Congress, he resumed the practice of law.

Death
Tracy died in Woodstock, Vermont, on October 28, 1868. He was interred in River Street Cemetery in Woodstock.

References

Further reading
 "History of Windsor county, Vermont" by Lewis Cass Aldrich, Frank R. Holmes, published by D. Mason & Co., 1891.

External links

 Biographical Directory of the United States Congress
 
 The Political Graveyard
 Govtrack.us
 Our Campaigns

1797 births
1868 deaths
People from Hartford, Vermont
Vermont lawyers
Speakers of the Vermont House of Representatives
Members of the Vermont House of Representatives
Burials in Vermont
Whig Party members of the United States House of Representatives from Vermont
19th-century American politicians
19th-century American lawyers